Federated States Of Micronesia–United States relations are bilateral relations between the Federated States Of Micronesia and the United States of America.

History 

There is a U.S. Embassy in Kolonia, Pohnpei, Federated States of Micronesia with a resident Ambassador to Micronesia.

Over 25 U.S. federal agencies continue to maintain programs in the FSM.  Under the Amended Compact, the U.S. has full authority and responsibility for the defense of the FSM.  This security relationship can be changed or terminated by mutual agreement. Also under the Compact, Micronesians can live, work, and study in the United States without a visa. Micronesians volunteer to serve in the U.S. Armed Forces at approximately double the per capita rate as Americans. Americans can live and work freely in the FSM without the need for a visa.

The U.S. will provide about $100 million annually in assistance to the FSM over the next 20 years. A Joint Economic Management Committee (JEMCO) consisting of representatives of both nations is responsible for ensuring that assistance funds are spent effectively, with the aim of fostering good governance and economic self-reliance. The basic relationship of free association continues indefinitely.

The United States is the FSM's largest trade partner.

Because of this financial relationship, the island nation has been called a haven for US military recruiters. This arrangement has been criticized because these Island Soldiers are not entitled to the same benefits as soldiers who are US citizens; and neither they nor their families are allowed to vote.

Principal U.S. Officials include Ambassador Carmen G. Cantor, Deputy Chief of Mission Richard K. Pruett, and Management Officer Jonathan Floss.

Diplomatic missions 

The Embassy of Micronesia in Washington, D.C. is the diplomatic mission of the Federated States of Micronesia to the United States. It is located at 1725 N Street, Northwest, Washington, D.C., in the Dupont Circle neighborhood.

The current ambassador is James Naich following the departure of Asterio R. Takesy in 2016.

See also
 Foreign relations of the Federated States of Micronesia
Island Soldier  (documentary film)

External links
 History of Micronesia – U.S. relations
U.S. Embassy in the Federated States of Micronesia

References

 
Micronesia 
United States